Google Play Games is a multi-platform gaming experience built and operated by Google featuring seamless gameplay across PCs, Chromebooks and mobile devices. 

Google Play Games for PC Beta launched in 2022 with a curated set of Android games optimized for PCs & Chromebooks. Google Play Games on mobile features instant play, gamer profiles, and achievements. The user gamer profile syncs across Google Play Games on PCs and mobile devices.

History
The Google Play Games service was introduced at the Google I/O 2013 Developer Conference, and the standalone Google Play Games mobile app was launched for Android on July 24, 2013. Andrew Webster of The Verge compared Google Play Games to Game Center, a similar gaming network for users of Apple Inc.'s own iOS operating system.

Google Play Games has received updates over the years since its launch, including a screen-recording feature, custom gamer IDs, built-in games, and an arcade for game discovery.

Real-time and turn-based multiplayer services have been deprecated since September 16, 2019. Support for these API functions ended on March 31, 2020. 

On December 9, 2021 at The Game Awards, Google announced that Google Play Games beta would launch in early 2022, bringing Android games to Windows PCs and laptops. On January 19, 2022, Google Play Games officially rolled out a beta experience of the product with a select catalog of games to a waitlist of users in Korea, Hong Kong, and Taiwan. The beta rollout continued on August 25, 2022 by making Google Play Games beta available for download to all players in Korea, Hong Kong, Taiwan, Thailand and Australia with an expanded catalog of game titles.

On November 2, 2022, global expansion of Google Play Games beta continued and launched to all users in the United States, Canada, Mexico, Brazil, Indonesia, Philippines, Malaysia, and Singapore.

The minimum specification requirements to run Google Play Games are currently for players who have a PC running Windows 10 or later with an integrated graphics card & quad-core CPU that can access Google Play Games beta (previously octo-core CPU).

References

External links
 
 Google Play Games on PC
 

Android (operating system) software
Play Games
Games
Products introduced in 2013
2013 software